William Donahue may refer to:

 William J. Donahue, United States Air Force general
 William Donahue (Quebec politician) (1834–1892)

See also
 Bill Donohue (born 1947), president of the Catholic League in the United States
 William J. Donohue (1873–1907), American politician from New York
 William Donohue (jockey), Canadian jockey and trainer